Combermere/Kamaniskeg Lake Water Aerodrome  is a seaplane base located  west northwest of Combermere, Ontario, Canada.

References

Registered aerodromes in Ontario
Transport in Renfrew County
Seaplane bases in Ontario